"The Libertine" is the first single from English singer-songwriter Patrick Wolf's second full-length album Wind in the Wires.

Track listing

CD-single
 "The Libertine [Radio Edit]" – 3:56 
 "Penzance" – 5:19
 "Wind in the Wires [Clifftop Demo]" – 2:26

7" vinyl single
 "The Libertine [Radio Edit]" – 3:56 
 "Afraid" (Nico cover) – 3:09

Charts

References

2005 singles
Patrick Wolf songs
2005 songs